Market Reversal in Finance is a type of a price retracement in which the value completely goes back to the beginning of the measured trading period.

One of the worst market reversals in global finance is the bull rally from 2003 which peaked in 2007 and collapsed which is now popularly known as The Great Recession.

References
As used by journalists:

https://www.wsj.com/articles/what-is-a-reversal-vs-correction-1452482743
https://www.cnbc.com/2016/01/20/why-the-wild-market-reversal.html
http://www.nasdaq.com/article/5-possible-indicators-of-a-market-reversal-cm608229
http://money.cnn.com/2016/06/27/investing/brexit-consequences-2-trillion-lost/

Financial markets